Mechode is a village in Palakkad District, Kerala, India. Its postal code is 678543.

References

Villages in Palakkad district